Laskovtsevo is a rural locality (a village) in Novlenskoye Rural Settlement, Vologodsky District, Vologda Oblast, Russia. The population was 17 as of 2002.

Geography 
Laskovtsevo is located 77 km northwest of Vologda (the district's administrative centre) by road. Dyakontsevo is the nearest rural locality.

References 

Rural localities in Vologodsky District